The year 2005 is the ninth year in the history of M-1 Global, a mixed martial arts promotion based in Russia. In 2005 M-1 Global held 5 events beginning with, M-1 MFC: International Fight Night.

Events list

M-1 MFC: International Fight Night

M-1 MFC: International Fight Night was an event held on February 5, 2005 in Saint Petersburg, Russia.

Results

M-1 MFC: Mix-fight

M-1 MFC: Mix-fight was an event held on April 10, 2005 in Saint Petersburg, Russia.

Results

M-1 MFC: New Blood

M-1 MFC: New Blood was an event held on October 1, 2005 in Saint Petersburg, Russia.

Results

M-1 MFC: Russia vs. France

M-1 MFC: Russia vs. France was an event held on November 3, 2005 in Saint Petersburg, Russia.

Results

M-1 MFC: Lightweight Cup

M-1 MFC: Lightweight Cup was an event held on December 8, 2005 in Saint Petersburg, Russia.

Results

See also 
 M-1 Global

References

M-1 Global events
2005 in mixed martial arts